Deceit is a 2009 American short film. The story takes place during the Vietnam War and revolves around a young girl and three soldiers trapped in a defensive fighting position. The film received the Audience Choice Award for Best Short Film at the 2009 Cinema City International Film Festival. It was also accepted by the SoCal Film Festival.

References

External links
 

2009 films
American short films
Vietnam War films
2000s English-language films